Sarkin Dawaki is a ward in Nigeria, existing in Jalingo Local Government Area of Taraba state.

References 

Local Government Areas in Taraba State